Bektaşlı is a village in the District of Balâ, Ankara Province, Turkey. Bektaşlı has an elevation of 887 metres. Bektaşlı is situated northwest of Küçükbıyık, and southeast of Büyükcamili.

The village was founded by the Bektaşi sect of Islam.The village is populated by Kurds.

References

Villages in Balâ District

Kurdish settlements in Ankara Province